Ebenezer Andrews (born 21 May 2000) is a Ghanaian badminton player. In April 2019, he was part of the Ghanaian team which won bronze at the All Africa Mixed Team Championship that was held in Port Harcourt, Nigeria.

Early life and education 
Andrews hails from Winneba in the Central Region in Ghana. He is a student of University of Education, Winneba.

Career 
Andrews took part in the 2013 All Africa Junior Badminton Championships (U-19) held in Algeria.

He also took part in the 10th All African Games at the Kenyatta University in Nairobi, Kenya.

Achievements 
Andrews and his pair Eyram Migbodzi beat their Ivorian counterparts Doulo Lou Annick and Ousmane Ovedroogo by 21–12, 21–13 to win in the men's double division.

In the 2018 Commonwealth Games held in Australia, Andrews and his pair Daniel Doe won gold in a 2-1 of three sets against Emmanuel Botwe and Abraham Ayittey in the doubles final.

Controversy 
In March 2022, Andrews and other Badminton players were suspended by the Badminton Association of Ghana and were confirmed ineligible players.

References 

2000 births
Living people
Ghanaian badminton players
Badminton players at the 2018 Commonwealth Games
Medallists at the 2018 Commonwealth Games
University of Education, Winneba alumni